The Surinaams Museum is a museum located at Abraham Crijnssenweg 1 in Fort Zeelandia, Paramaribo, Suriname.

Description
The Surinaams Museum is located inside Fort Zeelandia, the site where British and Dutch colonists first arrived in Suriname. In 1947, Stichting Surinaams Museum was founded in order to preserve the cultural heritage of Suriname. In 1954, Dirk Geijskes became its first director. In 1972, the museum moved to its current location in Fort Zeelandia. 

The permanent exhibit spaces include reconstructions of "an old apothecary shop, a cobbler shop and a prison cell in its original state." The museum displays a range of ethnographic and historical objects, including photographs, art, furniture, and textiles from the European, Hindustani, Maroon, Chinese, Javanese, and indigenous Amerindian people who once inhabited the fort and surrounding areas.
The collection includes 51 botanical drawings by the Surinamese artist Gerrit Schouten and about 400 glass negatives of the work of the Surinamese photographer Augusta Curiel.

See also 
 List of museums in Suriname
 The Magic Lantern of Mr. Furet, a narrative of plantation life in 1840s Suriname with contemporaneous illustrations.

References

External links 
 http://www.surinaamsmuseum.net (primarily in Dutch)

Ethnographic museums in South America
Museums in Suriname